Lawrence Pete (born January 18, 1966) is a former American football nose tackle.  He played five seasons in the NFL for the Detroit Lions who selected him with the 115th pick in the 1989 NFL Draft. He retired after the 1993 season and finished his career with 3.5 sacks, 3 fumble recoveries, and 61 games played with 19 starts.

He attended Wichita South High School.

His nephews Arthur and Bryce Brown were amongst the best high school football prospects in the United States. 

Lawrence Pete played nose tackle for the University of Nebraska from 1986-88.

References 

1966 births
Living people
Players of American football from Wichita, Kansas
American football defensive tackles
Nebraska Cornhuskers football players
Detroit Lions players